Sandilh Point (‘Nos Sandilh’ \'nos san-'dilh\) is the partly ice-free point on the northwest side of the entrance to Durostorum Bay on Oscar II Coast in Graham Land.  It is situated at the east extremity of Tepava Ridge, and was formed as a result of the break-up of Larsen Ice Shelf in the area, and the retreat of Pequod Glacier in the early 21st century.  Named after the Bulgar ruler Sandilh (6th century).

Location
SCAR Antarctic Digital Database mapping in 2012.

Maps
Antarctic Digital Database (ADD). Scale 1:250000 topographic map of Antarctica. Scientific Committee on Antarctic Research (SCAR). Since 1993, regularly upgraded and updated.

References
 Sandilh Point. SCAR Composite Antarctic Gazetteer.
 Bulgarian Antarctic Gazetteer. Antarctic Place-names Commission. (details in Bulgarian, basic data in English)

External links
 Sandilh Point. Copernix satellite image

Headlands of Graham Land
Oscar II Coast
Bulgaria and the Antarctic